Juliette Marquis (born April 16, 1980) is a Ukrainian born American actress, model, and former ballerina whose work has turned to documentary filmmaking. She is a partner at the production company More Better World, Inc. and is a producer, writer and director focused on non-fiction investigative storytelling.

Personal background
She moved from Ukraine to Chicago, Illinois when she was 8. She started modeling when she was 14 and lived in Paris. She later moved to New York City where she wrote and acted in plays. In 2002, she moved to Los Angeles and soon after got her first movie role.

Film career
For her performance in This Girl's Life, Marquis won Best Newcomer Award at the Vegas Film Festival, and a Best Actress Award at the Film Festival Internazionale di Milano 2005.

She appeared in ice hockey movie "Chicks with Sticks", directed by Kari Skogland, and "The Insurgents", directed by Scott Dacko.

She starred in the movie "Phantom Love" released in 2007, written, directed, and produced by Nina Menkes.  
  
Marquis earned a degree from Villanova University in Project Management, and launched Marquis Enterprise.

Filmography
 This Girl's Life (2003)
 Chicks with Sticks (2004)
 London (2005)
 Into the Sun (2005)
 The Insurgents (2006)
 The Phobic (2006)
 Phantom Love (2007)

References

External links

1980 births
Living people
Soviet emigrants to the United States
21st-century American actresses